Walter Bartlett Reed (4 February 1839 – 17 March 1880) was an English cricketer.  Reed was a right-handed batsman who bowled left-arm roundarm fast.  He was born at Sompting, Sussex.

Reed made his first-class debut for Sussex against Surrey in 1860.  He made five further first-class appearances for the county that season, the last of which came against the Marylebone Cricket Club.  In his six first-class appearances, he scored a total of 38 runs at an average of 4.22, with a high score of 10 not out.  With the ball, he took 2 wickets at a bowling average of 51.50, with best figures of 1/8.

He died at Storrington, Sussex on 17 March 1880.  His brother, Albert, also played first-class cricket for Sussex.

References

External links
Walter Reed at ESPNcricinfo
Walter Reed at CricketArchive

1839 births
1880 deaths
People from Sompting
English cricketers
Sussex cricketers
People from Storrington